Ahmet Uzun (born 1950 in Nicosia) was Minister of Finance in the Government of the Turkish Republic of Northern Cyprus, a non-recognized state. He was appointed to this portfolio in the TRNC Government from January 2004 to May 2009.

References

Living people
1950 births
People from Nicosia
Finance ministers of Northern Cyprus
Government ministers of Northern Cyprus